Maslyakha is a rural locality (a settlement) in Borovskoy Selsoviet, Krutikhinsky District, Altai Krai, Russia. The population was 222 as of 2013. There are 3 streets.

Geography 
Maslyakha is located 13 km north of Krutikha (the district's administrative centre) by road. Borovoye is the nearest rural locality.

References 

Rural localities in Krutikhinsky District